A partial lunar eclipse took place on Thursday, November 18, 1937, the second of two lunar eclipses in 1937.

Visibility

Related lunar eclipses

Half-Saros cycle
A lunar eclipse will be preceded and followed by solar eclipses by 9 years and 5.5 days (a half saros). This lunar eclipse is related to two partial solar eclipses of Solar Saros 122.

See also
List of lunar eclipses
List of 20th-century lunar eclipses

Notes

External links

1937-11
1937 in science